Lutte Internationale (International Wrestling) was a professional wrestling promotion based in Montreal, Quebec from 1980 to 1987. Former employees in Lutte consisted of professional wrestlers, managers, play-by-play and color commentators, announcers, interviewers and referees.

Alumni

Male wrestlers

Female wrestlers

Midget wrestlers

Stables and tag teams

Managers and valets

Commentators and interviewers

Referees

References

External links
Les Étoiles de la lutte
 
International Wrestling at Cagematch.net

Lists of professional wrestling personnel